The Indigo Line (Line 11)  is a proposed line of the Delhi Metro and is scheduled to be opened in 2025.

This 12.57 Km Line is proposed to have 10 stations – 5 Elevated & 5 Underground level. This Line is the part of Phase 4 Project of Delhi Metro.

Stations 

The stations proposed for the Indigo Line are:

References 

Delhi Metro lines